Bayou (1954–1982) was an American Thoroughbred racemare who was bred and raced by Bull Hancock's Claiborne Farm. and who was voted the American Champion Three-Year-Old Filly of 1957.

Bred in Kentucky, Bayou was sired by U.S. Racing Hall of Fame inductee Hill Prince and out of the mare, Bourtai. She was trained by Moody Jolley

References

1954 racehorse births
1982 racehorse deaths
Racehorses bred in Kentucky
Racehorses trained in the United States
American Champion racehorses
Thoroughbred family 9-f